Michael Shamus Wiles (born October 27, 1955) is an American character actor of film and television onscreen since the 1980s who has appeared in over 100 films and television shows.

Career
He portrayed Marc Mitscher in Pearl Harbor and Mr. Parmagi in Hellraiser: Inferno. He is also known for recurring roles as ASAC George Merkert on Breaking Bad and as Jury on Sons of Anarchy. Other notable appearances include Puppet Master 4, Lost Highway, Fight Club, Rock Star and Transformers. In 2011, he appeared in Rockstar Games hit detective game L.A. Noire as Fire Chief Albert Lynch. He appeared in a 2015 production of the Hydrogen Jukebox.

Filmography

Film

Television

Video games

External links

 Michael Shamus Wiles at Aveleyman
 Michael Shamus Wiles Breaking Bad Interview
 Hydrogen Jukebox Review

1955 births
Living people
People from Everett, Washington
American male film actors
American male television actors
Male actors from Washington (state)